How to Do Well When You're a Jerk and a Crybaby is a French comedy film directed by Michel Audiard, released in 1974. It is notable as the first film with the actor Jean-Claude Dreyfus. Audiard appears in the film as a nurse.

Synopsis 
Antoine (Jean Carmet) is a crybaby. This is an asset in his trade (sales representative for drinks) and for seducing women. Thus he becomes, through a rich nymphomaniac, director of a luxury hotel.

Technical data 
Director : Michel Audiard
Screenplay : Michel Audiard and Jean-Marie Poiré
Duration : 90 minutes
Release date : 19 June 1974
Language: French

Cast 
Jean Carmet : Antoine Robineau
Jean-Pierre Marielle : Gérard Malempin
Stéphane Audran : Cécile Malempin
Jane Birkin : Jane
Evelyne Buyle : Marie-Josée Mulot
Jean Rochefort : Foisnard
Daniel Prévost : Carducci
Jeanne Herviale : Robineau's mother
Robert Dalban : Léonce
Jacqueline Doyen : Madame Léonce
Jean-Claude Dreyfus : The transformist
Ginette Garcin : The head nurse
Minka : The surly nurse
Michel Audiard : The male nurse
Laurence Badie : The hotel attendant
Paul Bisciglia : The hunter
Féodor Atkine : The mime
Manu Pluton : The black
Sébastien Floche : Marcel

References

External links
 

French comedy films
1970s French-language films
1974 films
1974 comedy films
Films with screenplays by Michel Audiard
Films directed by Michel Audiard
1970s French films